The St. Thomas Tommies men's basketball team represents the University of St. Thomas, located in Saint Paul, Minnesota, in NCAA Division I as a member of the Summit League where they have been a member since their Division I debut in 2021.

The Tommies are lead by twelfth-year coach John Tauer.

The team currently plays its games at Schoenecker Arena on its campus in St. Paul. 

In 2023, St. Thomas announced plans for the new Lee and Penny Anderson Arena, with the team planned to begin playing its home games there in the fall of 2025.

Postseason results

NCAA Division III Tournament results
The Tommies have appeared in nineteen NCAA Division III Tournaments. Their combined record is 31–18.

References

External links
 

 
University of St. Thomas (Minnesota)